The 2015 Nanjing Ladies Open was a professional tennis tournament played on outdoor hard courts. It was the second edition of the tournament and part of the 2015 ITF Women's Circuit, offering a total of $100,000 in prize money. It took place in Nanjing, China, on 27 October to 1 November 2015.

Singles main draw entrants

Seeds 

 1 Rankings as of 19 October 2015.

Other entrants 
The following players received wildcards into the singles main draw:
  Liang Chen
  Wang Yan
  Xu Shilin
  Zheng Saisai

The following players received entry from the qualifying draw:
  Carolin Daniels
  Lu Jingjing
  Silvia Njirić
  Tian Ran

Champions

Singles

 Hsieh Su-wei def.  Yulia Putintseva, 7–6(7–5), 2–6, 6–2

Doubles

 Shuko Aoyama /  Eri Hozumi def.  Chan Chin-wei /  Zhang Kailin, 7–5, 6–7(7–9), [10–7]

External links 
 2015 Nanjing Ladies Open at ITFtennis.com

Nanjing
2015 in Chinese tennis
2015